The samba school Imperatriz Leopoldinense was created on March 6, 1956 in the suburb of Ramos, in Rio de Janeiro.
It is named after Maria Leopoldina, archduchess of Austria and Empress of Brazil, consort of  Emperor Pedro I.

Imperatriz began its successful journey to victory in 1980 when it won the championship for the first time. Since then it won the first prize eight times.

From 1992 to 2009, the school had a carnival as a teacher, artist, set designer and costume designer Rosa Magalhães, who has five titles to college.

Imperatriz Leopoldinense's championships
1980: O que que a Bahia tem First championship of the school together with Portela and Beija-Flor. The theme was the state of Bahia and its traditions.
1981: O teu cabelo não nega Imperatriz was the only champion. The theme refers to an ancient Brazilian composer.
1989: Liberdade, liberdade, abre as asas sobre nós Luxury and happiness were the two main features of the parade of Imperatriz. The theme recalls the history of Brazilian republican history.
1994: Catarina de Médicis na corte dos Tupínambôs e Tabajeres Very impressive floats and costumes were the main features of this presentation which tells us the story of a feast based in Brazilian Indian rites, in the city of Rouen, France, in the 16th century.
1995: Mais vale um jegue que me caregue que um camelo que me derrube, lá no Ceará The theme focused on the importation of camels to be used as transportation in the Northeast of Brazil during the second half of the 19th century.
1999: Brasil mostra a sua cara em... Theatrum Rerum Naturalium Brasilie The theme was a 17th-century book called Theatrum Rerum Naturalium Brasilie which shows the first realistic drawings of Brazilian fauna and flora.
2000: Quem descobriu o Brasil, foi seu Cabral, no dia 22 de abril, dois meses depois do carnaval The theme was an homage to the 500 years of the Discovery of Brazil by the Portuguese navigators.
2001: Cana-caiana, cana roxa, cana fita, cana preta, amarela, Pernambuco... Quero vê descê o suco, na pancada do ganzá The theme tells the story of the sugar cane in Brazil, with a detour to talk about the "cachaça", the most famous Braziian spirit which is made out of the sugar cane.

Classifications

References 

Samba schools of Rio de Janeiro
1956 establishments in Brazil